Emerald Heights International School ground is located in Indore, Madhya Pradesh. The ground was founded in 2001. The ground has got pavilion and can accommodate 500 persons.  It has basketball and volleyball courts and a two international level cricket ground along with one gymnasium hall. It also has facilities for swimming, table tennis, billiards, cards and tennis courts. It has one main clubhouse.

School has a two international level cricket ground, deco Turf courts for lawn tennis, six glass courts for squash, two football fields and hosted Subroto Cup matches, there are 25 tables for table tennis, swimming pool, there are 6 basketball courts of which 2 are indoor and 4 outdoor, 6 badminton courts and has automated Indoor Shooting range with 22 targets. There are four Volley Ball courts etc.

Records

First-class 

 Highest Team Total:                  546 Haryana v Madhya Pradesh   2009/10      
 Lowest Team Total:                   96 Assam v Madhya Pradesh 2008/09
 Highest Individual Score:            312  Sunny Singh Haryana v Madhya Pradesh   2009/10 	
 Highest partnership:                 244* Rahul Dewan & Ankit Rawat, Haryana v Madhya Pradesh   2009/10

List A 

 Highest team total: 304/7 Madhya Pradesh  v Rajasthan   2009/10
 Lowest team total:   n/a
 Highest individual score:   150*  Amit Paunikar Railways v Vidarbha   2012/13 
 Highest partnership: 221 Naman Ojha & Hrishikesh Kanitkar, Madhya Pradesh v  Vidarbha 2008/09

Twenty20 

 Highest team total:   233/7 Delhi v Kerala 2012/13
 Lowest team total:    80  Delhi v Orrissa    2012/13
 Highest individual score:   125  Unmukt Chand Delhi v Guajarat   2012/13 
 Highest partnership: 202* Manpreet Juneja & Abdulahad Malik Guajarat v Kerala 2012/13

References

External links
Cricinfo profile
Cricketarchive.com (1)

Sports venues in Indore
Cricket grounds in Madhya Pradesh
Multi-purpose stadiums in India
Basketball venues in India
Volleyball venues in India
Tennis venues in India
Sports venues completed in 2001
2001 establishments in Madhya Pradesh